Emich, Prince of Leiningen (18 January 1866 – 18 July 1939) was the son of Ernst, Prince of Leiningen. He was the fifth Prince of Leiningen from 1904 to 1918, and afterwards titular Prince of Leiningen from 1918 until his death.

Early life
Emich was born at Osborne House, Isle of Wight, United Kingdom, the second child and only son of Ernst, Prince of Leiningen (1830–1904), (son of Karl, Prince of Leiningen and Countess Marie von Klebelsberg) and his wife, Princess Marie of Baden (1834–1899), (daughter of Leopold, Grand Duke of Baden and Princess Sophie of Sweden). Through his mother he was descendant of Swedish monarchs, such as Gustav IV Adolf and Gustav III. His paternal grandfather, Carl, 3rd Prince of Leiningen, was the half-brother of Queen Victoria.

He was baptised at Osborne House on 10 February 1866 and his godparents were his paternal great-aunt, Princess Feodora of Leiningen, his maternal uncle Frederick I, Grand Duke of Baden (represented by Hermann, Prince of Hohenlohe-Langenburg) and his paternal uncle Prince Eduard of Leiningen (represented by Ernest II, Duke of Saxe-Coburg and Gotha).

Marriage
Emich married on 12 July 1894  in Langenburg to Princess Feodore of Hohenlohe-Langenburg (23 July 1866–1 November 1932), youngest child of Hermann, Prince of Hohenlohe-Langenburg and his wife, Princess Leopoldine of Baden.

They had five children:
Princess Viktoria of Leiningen (12 May 1895 – 9 February 1973) she married Count Maximilian of Solms-Rödelheim-Assenheim on 23 February 1922 and they were divorced in 1937. They had one son:
Count Markwart of Solms-Rödelheim-Assenheim (30 June 1925 – 28 September 1976)
Emich Ernst, Hereditary Prince of Leiningen (Emich Ernst Hermann Heinrich Maximilian; 29 December 1896 - 21 March 1918) he died at the age of twenty-one during World War I. 
Karl, Prince of Leiningen (13 February 1898 – 2 August 1946) he married Grand Duchess Maria Kirillovna of Russia on 24 November 1924. They had seven children, fifteen grandchildren and twenty-eight great-grandchildren.
Prince Hermann Viktor Maximilian of Leiningen (4 January 1901 – 29 March 1971) he married Countess Irina of Schönborn-Wiesentheid on 21 December 1938. No children.
Prince Hesso Leopold Heinrich of Leiningen (23 July 1903 – 19 June 1967) he married Countess Marie-Luise of Nesselrode on 12 July 1933. No children.

Prince of Leiningen
On the death of his father in 1904, Emich became the Prince of Leiningen.

Honours
 : Knight of the Military Merit Order, 4th Class
 :
 Grand Cross of the Friedrich Order, 1894
 Grand Cross of the Order of the Württemberg Crown, 1905
 : Knight Grand Cross of the Royal Victorian Order, 8 September 1898
 : Grand Cross of the Merit Order of Philip the Magnanimous, 11 July 1902
 : Knight of the House Order of Fidelity, 1904
   Austria-Hungary: Knight of the Order of Franz Joseph, 1893
    Ernestine duchies: Grand Cross of the Saxe-Ernestine House Order
 :
 Knight of the Royal Order of the Crown, 1st Class
 Knight's Cross of the Royal House Order of Hohenzollern
 Knight of Honour of the Johanniter Order

Ancestry

References

The Royal House of Stuart, London, 1969, 1971, 1976, Addington, A. C., Reference: 1951

1866 births
1939 deaths
People from Strasbourg
Emich, 05
Emich, 05
Emich, 05
Emich, 05
Recipients of the Military Merit Order (Bavaria)
Knights of the Order of Franz Joseph